Melbourne Bus Link was an Australian bus and coach operator in Melbourne. It was a Melbourne bus company that operated nine bus routes under contract to the Public Transport Victoria. Melbourne Bus Link ceased operations on 3 August 2013.

History

In April 1998 a consortium owned by Dysons and Reservoir Bus Company commenced operating a contract to operate the remaining bus services of Met Bus in the western and south-east regions of Melbourne. Included were depots at Footscray and Sandringham and 86 MAN SL200 buses. In November 2012, Dysons bought out Reservoir Bus Company and fully owned Melbourne Bus Link.

In April 2013, Transdev Melbourne were announced as the preferred tenderer to operate the Melbourne Metropolitan Bus Franchise, which included the services operated by Melbourne Bus Link. Melbourne Bus Link ceased operations on 3 August 2013.

Fleet
When operations ceased in August 2013, Melbourne Bus Link operated 86 buses, primarily Volgren bodied Scanias. The fleet livery was white with purple and orange stripes.

See also
Buses in Melbourne
List of Victorian Bus Companies
List of Melbourne bus routes

References

External links

Company website
Public Transport Victoria timetables
Showbus gallery

Bus companies of Victoria (Australia)
Bus transport in Melbourne
1998 establishments in Australia
2013 disestablishments in Australia